Events from the year 1926 in Taiwan, Empire of Japan.

Incumbents

Central government of Japan
 Prime Minister: Katō Takaaki, Wakatsuki Reijirō

Taiwan
 Governor-General – Takio Izawa, Kamiyama Mitsunoshin

Events

May
 12 May – The establishment of Taiwan Provincial Ilan School of Agriculture and Forestry in Taihoku Prefecture.

Births
 31 March – Tseng Wen-hui, First Lady of the Republic of China (1988–2000)
 15 October – Koo Kwang-ming, politician (died 2023)

References

 
Years of the 20th century in Taiwan